This article discusses topics relating to genetic engineering within Oceania. Currently New Zealand and Australia require labeling so consumers can exercise choice between foods that have genetically modified, conventional, or organic origins.

Australia
Genetic engineering in Australia was originally (since 1987) overseen by the Genetic Manipulation Advisory Committee, before the Office of the Gene Technology Regulator (OGTR) and Food Standards Australia New Zealand took over in 2001.  The OTGR is a Commonwealth Government Authority within the Department of Health and Ageing and reports directly to Parliament through a Ministerial Council on Gene Technology and has legislative powers. It was established as part of the Gene Technology Act 2003 and operates according to the Gene Technology Regulations 2001. The OGTR reports directly to Parliament through a Ministerial Council on Gene Technology and has legislative powers.
The OGTR decides on license applications for the release of all genetically modified organisms, while regulation is provided by the Therapeutic Goods Administration for GM medicines or Food Standards Australia New Zealand for GM food. The individual state governments are then able to assess the impact of release on markets and trade and apply further legislation to control approved genetically modified products.

Genetically modified cotton, canola, and carnations are grown in Australia. Genetically modified cotton has been grown commercially in New South Wales and Queensland since 1996. GM canola was approved in 2003 and was first grown in 2008 and was first approved in Western Australia in 2010.

In 2011 genetically modified plants were grown in all states except South Australia and Tasmania, who have extended their moratoriums until 2019 and 2014. The Queensland and Northern Territory Governments have not implemented any further legislation beyond the national level, but several other states placed bans on planting certain GM crops. In 2007 the New South Wales government extended a blanket moratorium on GM food crops until 2011, but allowed groups to apply for exemptions. New South Wales approved GM Canola for commercial cultivation in 2008, while the Victorian government let the moratorium on GM Canola expire in 2007. Western Australia passed the Genetically Modified Crops Free Areas Act in 2003 and was declared a GM free area in 2004. In 2008 an exception was made for the commercial cultivation of GM cotton in the Ord River Irrigation Areas. Trials of GM canola were carried out in 2003 and in 2010 the Western Australian government allowed the commercialisation of GM canola.

New Zealand

Genetic engineering is a contentious issue in New Zealand.  no genetically modified food was grown in New Zealand, and no medicines containing live genetically modified organisms have been approved for use. However, medicines manufactured using genetically modified organisms that do not contain live organisms have been approved for sale, and imported foods with genetically modified components are sold. Food Standards Australia New Zealand (FSANZ) must approve any food produced from GM crops, or made using genetically engineered enzymes, before it can be marketed in Australia or New Zealand. FSANZ makes a list of such approvals available on its website.

In 2000 the Government appointed a Royal Commission to report on issues relating to genetically modified organisms (GMOs). The Report of the Royal Commission on Genetic Modification, released in July 2001, concluded that New Zealand should keep its options open with regard to genetic engineering and to proceed carefully in order to minimise and manage any risks. Field trials have been carried out with GM pine trees and brassicas.

Prior to the 2002 general election, the book Seeds of Distrust was published which highlighted possible contamination of imported corn seed with GMO seeds. During the election campaign the book caused an amount of friction between the Labour and Green Parties, referred to as "Corngate" in the media.

Field trials of genetically engineered Pinus radiata trees is being carried out by SCION, a Crown Research Institute. Environmental activists breached the security at the site and damaged 19 of the trees in 2008. No organisation claimed responsibility but a spade left on the site had a "GE-free New Zealand" sticker attached to it. Brassica species have been approved by ERMA for a ten-year field trial in Canterbury. The conditions that were set for the trial were breached and lobbyists called for an end to the trial.

References

Genetic engineering by country
Genetic engineering in New Zealand